SS Waihora was a 2,003-ton passenger cargo steamship built by William Denny & Brothers, Dumbarton in 1882 for the Union Steam Ship Company of New Zealand.

Waihora stuck a rock of the coast of Tasmania in February 1886 and was holed. She was sold subsequently to Koe Guan Company, Penang in 1903, to Diedrichsen & Jebsen & Company, Hamburg in 1906 and renamed Lysholt and later to H. Diedrichsen, Hamburg in 1909.

Fate
She was broken up at Shanghai in 1911.

Notes

1882 ships
Ships built on the River Clyde
Passenger ships of New Zealand
Ships of the Union Steam Ship Company